Rockingham bus station was a Transperth bus station located next to Rockingham City Shopping Centre,  south of Perth, Western Australia.

The original Rockingham bus station opened in November 1974.

A new station was opened on 8 May 1981 by the minister for transport, Cyril Rushton. This enabled Rockingham to receive more bus services to Perth and Fremantle, as well as new and increased suburban feeder routes through Rockingham.

It closed on 7 October 2007, being replaced by bus facilities at Rockingham railway station. It was demolished in 2008.

References

Buildings and structures demolished in 2008
Former bus stations
Bus stations in Perth, Western Australia
Rockingham, Western Australia
Transport infrastructure completed in 1981
1981 establishments in Australia
2007 disestablishments in Australia